Jared Raymond Lorenzen (February 14, 1981 – July 3, 2019) was an American football quarterback and administrator who played in the National Football League (NFL) for four seasons with the New York Giants. He played college football at the University of Kentucky, where he set the school records for passing yards and passing touchdowns, and was signed by the Giants as an undrafted free agent in 2004. At 285 lb (129 kg), Lorenzen was the heaviest quarterback to play in the NFL. He was nicknamed "Hefty Lefty" because of his weight and being left-handed.

Seeing little playing time in NFL, Lorenzen spent his entire career as a backup, although he was part of the Giants' Super Bowl-winning team in Super Bowl XLII. Following a preseason stint with the Indianapolis Colts, Lorenzen played indoor football for the AF2, Ultimate Indoor Football League (UIFL), and Continental Indoor Football League (CIFL) from 2009 to 2014. He also served as the commissioner of the UIFL in 2012.

Lorenzen struggled with his weight throughout most of his life, which was exacerbated following a leg injury that ended his playing career. Amid various health complications deriving from his weight, he died in 2019 at the age of 38.

Early years
Lorenzen weighed 13.3 pounds at birth. 
Lorenzen attended Highlands High School in Fort Thomas, Kentucky, and was a letterman in football, basketball, and baseball. In basketball, he was a three-year letterman and helped lead his team to Kentucky Sweet 16 appearances. As a junior, he passed for a Northern Kentucky-record 2,759 yards and 37 touchdowns in 13 games. As a senior in 1998, he completed 62 percent of his passes for 3,393 yards, 45 touchdowns and six interceptions. He also rushed for 904 yards (8.4 average per carry) and 15 TDs in leading Highlands to a 15–0 season and No.19 national ranking as a senior, earning him the Mr. Football Award. Five games into his senior season, Lorenzen committed to the University of Kentucky.

College career
When Lorenzen arrived at the University of Kentucky, he redshirted as a true freshman. As a redshirt freshman, he was named the team's starting quarterback by Wildcats head coach Hal Mumme ahead of returning starter Dusty Bonner. The move caused Bonner to transfer. Lorenzen's career at Kentucky was marked by two head coaching changes; Mumme departed as an investigation into NCAA rules violations brought down his staff and resulted in the program being placed on probation with scholarship limitations. After Lorenzen helped lead the team to a 7–5 record in 2002, head coach Guy Morriss left to become the head coach at Baylor University and was replaced by Rich Brooks, who designed plays in which Lorenzen lined up as a receiver while Shane Boyd played quarterback. Despite all the turmoil, Lorenzen set school records in total offense, passing yards, and passing touchdowns, eclipsing many marks set by 1999 NFL No. 1 overall draft pick Tim Couch.

College statistics

Professional career

New York Giants
Lorenzen was not selected in the 2004 NFL Draft and signed as undrafted free agent with the New York Giants. He declined an offer by coach Tom Coughlin to play in NFL Europe in 2005. Lorenzen was the third string quarterback for 2004 and 2005 for the Giants, behind starter Eli Manning and backup Tim Hasselbeck.

In the 2006 preseason, Lorenzen led his team to victory by engineering a game-winning drive against the Baltimore Ravens. Following that performance and an impressive training camp he was officially named the Giants' backup quarterback three weeks later.
   
Lorenzen made his first appearance on the field in a Giants uniform on December 30, 2006. During this game, he was used for one play, a quarterback sneak to make a first down on a third-and-one.
   
Lorenzen made his second appearance on Sunday, January 7, 2007, in the Giants' wild card loss against the Philadelphia Eagles. On the Giants' opening drive, he lined up at quarterback on a third-and-one and got the first down, "shifting the pile" in the process, on the way to a Giants touchdown.
   
Lorenzen's first significant regular season appearance occurred on September 9, 2007, when he took over for the injured Manning in the fourth quarter of the season opener against the Dallas Cowboys. Lorenzen made both his first regular season pass and rush, but failed to earn a first down. He played again the following week, against the Green Bay Packers, completing three passes in five attempts for 21 yards. This proved to be his final appearance in the NFL, as Manning's injury did not cost him any further playing time and Lorenzen did not see further action in the 2007 season. He continued to serve as Manning's backup for the remainder of the season, which concluded with the Giants winning Super Bowl XLII against the then-undefeated New England Patriots and Lorenzen earning a championship ring.
    
After the team's Super Bowl win, Lorenzen was released by the Giants on June 23, 2008.

Indianapolis Colts
On July 24, 2008, Lorenzen was signed by the Indianapolis Colts. He played during the preseason, but was waived during the final cuts for the 53-man roster.

Kentucky Horsemen
On February 10, 2009, Lorenzen was assigned to the Kentucky Horsemen of the AF2 league. The team went bankrupt and was dissolved in October 2009.

Coaching
After the Horsemen folded, Lorenzen retired as a player. On March 23, 2010, he was hired as the quarterbacks coach at his alma mater, Highlands High School, in Fort Thomas, Kentucky.

Northern Kentucky River Monsters
In 2011, Lorenzen returned to professional football, this time working as the general manager of the Northern Kentucky River Monsters of the Ultimate Indoor Football League. Still wanting to compete on the field, Lorenzen resigned as GM to become the team's starting quarterback. Lorenzen had a highly successful season, throwing for 81 touchdowns and winning the league's MVP award.

After gaining some positive press for his return to football, Lorenzen was named commissioner of the league after the 2011 season.

Owensboro Rage
Still wanting to play, Lorenzen quit the UIFL's top job and signed with the Owensboro Rage of the Continental Indoor Football League partway through the 2013 season. The Rage folded two weeks prior to the end of the season due to lack of funds.

Return to the River Monsters
Lorenzen returned to the River Monsters, by this point a member of the Continental Indoor Football League, on December 17, 2013. In Lorenzen's first game of the season, Lorenzen showed that he still had plenty of skill, side-stepping defenders. Lorenzen's play was filmed and the videos ended up all over the internet, overshadowing the River Monsters' 36–20 victory over the Bluegrass Warhorses. The following week, however, Lorenzen broke his tibia in a 42–30 loss to the Erie Explosion, ending his pro playing career.

Post-football career
Lorenzen was a guest host of the Lexington-based radio show Kentucky Sports Radio, mainly during UK football season. In 2015, he started a T-shirt company, ThrowboyTees.

His story was  documented by ESPN in July 2018.

Death
Lorenzen died on July 3, 2019, at age 38.  from an acute infection, complicated by heart and kidney problems.

References

1981 births
2019 deaths
American football quarterbacks
Highlands High School (Fort Thomas, Kentucky) alumni
Kentucky Wildcats football players
New York Giants players
Indianapolis Colts players
Kentucky Horsemen players
Northern Kentucky River Monsters players
Owensboro Rage players
Sportspeople from Covington, Kentucky
Players of American football from Kentucky
High school football coaches in Kentucky
Infectious disease deaths in Kentucky